The Bundeswehrfeuerwehr is a fire fighting institution which exist in all branches of Bundeswehr, the armed forces of Germany.

Area of responsibility
The German armed forces are responsible for firefighting on their property. Usually this task is delegated to the local fire brigades. On some military realties though, Bundeswehr maintains its own fire fighting service. This Bundeswehrfeuerwehr is deployed to objects with an increased potential of danger, such as underground facilities, airbases, naval bases, military training grounds, ammunition depots or technical centres. Military camps for missions abroad maintain firefighting personnel that consists of regular troops, e.g. firefighters from special engineer battalions of the Joint Support Service or of the German Air Force Regiment.

Tasks
The primary task of the Bundeswehrfeuerwehr is to ensure the safety of Bundeswehr personnel and the operational readiness of the forces. The firefighters are in service with army, air force and naval units, they are deployed to armament facilities and basically to all objects that constitute a special fire or explosion hazard and that are vital for national defense.

The tasks of a Bundeswehr firefighter are very similar to those of a regular publicly employed firefighter. They will rescue persons from dangerous situations and will fight fires, e.g. vehicle or ammunition fires.

On naval grounds, firefighting duties must also be performed on ships, boats and at harbour facilities. Further tasks include technical support, emergency management, environmental protection and support of local fire brigades.

Equipment

The various types of fire engines usually have red livery (RAL 3000) since the late 1990s. Special vehicles include airport crash tenders, Brush Trucks and rescue trucks for the evacuation of pilots.

Literature 
 Kraftfahrzeuge und Panzer der Reichswehr, Wehrmacht und Bundeswehr, Oswald, Motorbuch Verlag 
 Fahrzeuge der Bundeswehr seit 1955, Plate, Motorbuch Verlag 
 Die Rad- und Kettenfahrzeuge der Bundeswehr 1956 bis heute, Ahnweiler, Blank, Bechtermünz Verlag 
 Rad- und Kettenfahrzeuge der Bundeswehr in den 90er Jahren, Ahnweiler, Plate, Pahlkötter, Motorbuch Verlag 
 Deutsche Militärfahrzeuge Bundeswehr und NVA, Gau, Plate, Siegert, Motorbuch Verlag 
 Prototypen und Sonderfahrzeuge der Bundeswehr seit 1956 - Band 1, Ahnweiler, Motorbuch Verlag 
 Prototypen und Sonderfahrzeuge der Bundeswehr seit 1956 - Band 2, Ahnweiler, Motorbuch Verlag

See also
German fire services

External links
 

Military administrative corps of Germany
Fire departments of Germany